Somer Valley FM is a local community radio station in North East Somerset that serves Midsomer Norton, Radstock, Westfield and surrounding areas. It was launched in 2008.

Ownership and structure

The station is owned by Somer Valley Community Radio Limited, a not-for-profit organisation that exists for community benefit.  The company's Board of Directors has ultimate responsibility for every aspect of the running of Somer Valley FM. There are five Directors: Dom Chambers, Pete Helmore, Graeme King, Mark Kenny and Chris Watt. The station is located in the grounds of Somervale School, next to a Crimean War obelisk monument built in 1866 by the owners of Norton House, a mansion that formerly stood on the site.

Coverage

The station broadcasts on 97.5 FM as well as online. Its target area covers Radstock, Midsomer Norton, Westfield, Paulton, Peasedown St John, Kilmersdon, Clutton, Shoscombe, Stratton-on-the-Fosse, Downside, Chilcompton, Farrington Gurney, Gurney Slade, Litton, Ston Easton, Chewton Mendip and Timsbury. Somer Valley FM is the only broadcaster focusing exclusively on this region.

In 2011 local market research company Cognisant Research carried out an audience survey for the station.  This found that 48.1 per cent of people living in the station's broadcast area have heard of the station and just above 16 per cent listen at least once a week.

in 2015 Somer Valley FM joined Ofcom's Small scale DAB trial licence scheme and can be heard on DAB in the Bristol area.

History

The station originally grew from a schools radio project organised in Somervale School in 2006. This led to the station's first broadcast on a Restricted Service Licence (RSL) in August that year. This resulted in an application for a full community license which Ofcom awarded in 2007. The station launched on the internet on 20 October 2008 and began FM transmission on 12 January 2009.

The idea for the station came from local councilor Chris Watt and Somervale School's Mike Gormen and Mark Kenny who saw the value to school students of learning about radio production. The original board of directors was Mark Kenny, Mike Walker and Chris Watt. Having successfully achieved funding for the project Somervale's dilapidated old caretakers' house, which adjoins the school, was redeveloped as a radio station with three "on air" studios and good production facilities. In July 2008 the directors appointed Dom Chambers, from a background in ILR and BBC, as the station manager. The station launched with a grant awarded by the RDA which was match funded by Bath and North East Somerset Council. In November 2008 Rupert Kirkham was appointed to lead production and school’s radio training. In the same month Dom Chambers was invited to join the board of directors. .

Somer Valley FM is a local radio station that provides opportunities for businesses to raise awareness of products and services with a local customer base. The station is funded by a combination of advertising, sponsorship, grant funding, media training and commissioned programmes.

In March 2011 the station were highly commended at The Chairman of Bath and North East Somerset Business Awards in the Not Profit category.

In May 2011, the station had a breach recorded against its license by Ofcom after a request show asked listeners to pick songs even though it wasn't being broadcast live. Ofcom had received complaints from two listeners who had discovered that the Jukebox Hour on 28 February 2011 at 5pm had been recorded prior to broadcast but the presenter was still inviting listeners for song requests. The station offered its "unreserved" apologies that it "inadvertently may have misled the listener" and said that as a result of the incident it has tightened its procedures.

In July 2011 Station Manager Dom Chambers was elected to the national council of the Community Media Association (CMA), which looks after the interests of community media nationally.

In November 2011 Somer Valley FM were awarded Young Volunteer Team of the Year at The Chairman of Bath & North East Somerset Council's annual community awards.

In November 2012 Somer Valley FM, along with Three Ways School in Bath, were Highly Commended in the Youth Team of the Year category at The Chairman of Bath & North East Somerset Council's annual Community Awards.

In November 2013 the Radio Academy named Somer Valley FM as South West Station of the Year.

In December 2013 Somer Valley FM manager, Dom Chambers was appointed Chair of the Community Media Association (CMA) serving for two years.

In May 2017 The Somer Valley Education Trust CIO is registered with the Charity Commission (England & Wales). This recognises the benefits to individuals and society of communications and media training.

In September 2017 the Somer Valley Education Trust commissioned the radio station to deliver the outcomes of its Media Education, Training & Skills (METS) programme

In August 2018 Somer Valley FM named as one of 48 businesses in the UK to receive The Princess Royal Award for Training

In September 2018 Somer Valley FM received Gold at the Community Radio Awards in the Community Development Project of the Year category for the METS Programme.

Content

The station is on air 24 hours a day, seven days a week, offering between ten and twelve hours of live programmes during weekdays.

Awards
2013 Radio Academy South West Station of the Year 
2016 Sports Show of the Year at The Community Radio Awards
2018 The Princess Royal Award for Training 
2018 Community Development Project of the Year at The Community Radio Awards (For the METS programme)

References

External links
 

Radio stations established in 2008
Radio stations in Somerset
Community radio stations in the United Kingdom
Midsomer Norton
Radstock